Herculano Bucancil Nabian (born 25 January 2004) is a professional footballer who plays as a forward for the Italian club Empoli, on loan from Vitória Guimarães. Born in Guinea-Bissau, he is a youth international for Portugal.

Club career
Born in Bissau, Nabian was formed at C.F. Os Belenenses before joining Vitória de Guimarães in 2018. His tally of 51 goals in two years in their youth team earned attention from foreign teams, and in July 2020, he signed his first professional contract of three years with the option of one more, and a buyout clause of €60 million.

In the 2020–21 season, he took part with the reserve team in the third tier, scoring 7 goals in 21 games. This included a hat-trick on 3 April in a 5–1 win over the second team of Rio Ave FC. On 26 July 2021, he made his first-team debut in the first round of the Taça da Liga in a 4–1 home win over Leixões S.C. as an 85th-minute substitute; he assisted the final goal by Maga. His Primeira Liga bow came on 8 August again as a late replacement at the Estádio D. Afonso Henriques, in a 1–0 loss to Portimonense SC.

On 6 August 2022, Nabian joined Italian club Empoli on loan with an option to buy. He was initially assigned to the club's Under-19 Primavera squad.

Career statistics

Club

Notes

References

External links

2004 births
Living people
Sportspeople from Bissau
Portuguese footballers
Portugal youth international footballers
Bissau-Guinean footballers
Bissau-Guinean emigrants to Portugal
Association football forwards
Campeonato de Portugal (league) players
Primeira Liga players
Serie A players
C.F. Os Belenenses players
Vitória S.C. players
Vitória S.C. B players
Empoli F.C. players
Portuguese expatriate footballers
Expatriate footballers in Italy
Portuguese expatriate sportspeople in Italy